Upholstery is the work of providing furniture, especially seats, with padding, springs, webbing, and fabric or leather covers. The word also refers to the materials used to upholster something.  

Upholstery comes from the Middle English word upholder, which referred to an artisan who makes fabric furnishings. The term is equally applicable to domestic, automobile, airplane and boat furniture, and can be applied to mattresses, particularly the upper layers, though these often differ significantly in design. A person who works with upholstery is called an upholsterer. An apprentice upholsterer is sometimes called an outsider or trimmer. Traditional upholstery uses materials like coil springs (post-1850), animal hair (horse, hog and cow), coir, straw and hay, hessians, linen scrims, wadding, etc., and is done by hand, building each layer up. In contrast, today's upholsterers employ synthetic materials like dacron and vinyl, serpentine springs, and so on.

History

Upholder is an archaic term used for "upholsterer", but it appears to have a connotation of repairing furniture rather than creating new upholstered pieces from scratch (cobbler vs. cordwainer).

In 18th-century London, upholders frequently served as interior decorators responsible for all aspects of a room's decor. These individuals were members of the Worshipful Company of Upholders, whose traditional role, prior to the 18th century, was to provide upholstery and textiles and the fittings for funerals. In the great London furniture-making partnerships of the 18th century, a cabinet-maker usually paired with an upholder: Vile and Cobb, Ince and Mayhew, Chippendale and Rannie or Haig.

In the US, Grand Rapids, Michigan, and Hickory, North Carolina, are centers for furniture manufacture along with Long Eaton, Nottinghamshire (England) and many of the best upholsterers can still be found there. Nottinghamshire is also home to Webs training Ltd, a furniture training company that specialises in training apprentices in the furniture manufacturing industry. These artisans continue to create or recreate many antique and modern pieces of furniture.

Furniture reupholstery continues to thrive in the UK with several businesses small and large providing these services.

Types

Traditional
Traditional upholstery is a craft which evolved over centuries for padding and covering chairs, seats and sofas, before the development of sewing machines, synthetic fabrics and plastic foam. Using a solid wood or webbed platform, it can involve the use of springs, lashings, stuffings of animal hair, grasses and coir, wools, hessians, scrims, bridle ties, stuffing ties, blind stitching, top stitching, flocks and wadding all built up by hand.

In the Middle Ages, domestic interiors were becoming more comfortable and upholstery was playing an important part in interior decoration. The decorations consisted mainly of what we would now consider as "soft furnishings", though there were simple platforms of webbing, canvas or leather for stools, chairs and elaborately decorated coverings that already demonstrated the rudimentary beginnings of upholstered furniture. By the beginning of the 17th century chair seats were being padded, but this form of upholstery was still fairly basic. All sorts of stuffings from sawdust, grass, feathers, to deer, goat or horsehair were used, although in England the Livery Company forbade the use of goat and deer hair and imposed fines for misdemeanors. The stuffing was heaped on a wooden platform and held in place with a decorative top fabric and nails. This produced a simple dome shape sloping towards the seat. Only towards the end of the 17th century did upholsterers start to develop the techniques that would distribute and shape the stuffing into more controlled shapes. Curled horsehair was being used more consistently for stuffing that was easier to hold in place with stitches in twine that were developed from saddlery techniques. Thus layers of stuffing could be distributed evenly and secured to stay in place. On a basic level, squab cushions were made more stable by using tufting ties. Stuffed edge rolls appeared on seat fronts providing support for cushions to be retained and later for deeper stuffing to be held in place under a fixed top cover.

What we now think of as "classic" upholstery shapes and techniques flourished in the 18th century. Frames of elegant line and proportion were sympathetically matched by expertly executed upholstery. By now, the upholsterers' technical knowledge meant that stuffing's could be controlled along upright and sloping lines, giving new levels of comfort and a simply stated elegance. Later in the century, the border was replaced by a single piece of linen or scrim taken over the stuffed seat and tacked to the frame. At the same time the locked blind stitch and top-stitching combination (pulling the side and top surfaces together and bringing the stuffing up to make a firm top edge) had evolved.

In the Victorian era, fashions of opulence and comfort gave rise to excesses of stuffing and padding. Mass production techniques made upholstered furniture available in large quantity to all sections of society. The availability of better-quality steel springs and the development of lashing techniques enabled upholstery to be built up on seats, backs and arms quite independently of the frame shape. Stuffings became even more complex, edges became elaborately shaped into rolls and scrolls and fabrics were folded into soft padded shapes by means of buttoning.

Modern
Modern furniture is more likely to be part or wholly made with cellular Polyurethane foam. This provides structure, resilience (recovery from loading) and most importantly light weight. This is then covered with an outer decorative textile.
The synthetic polymer will age and lose performance within a “reasonable” time and be significantly lighter than the traditional fillings. (In this context foam is graded by its weight per cubic metre. 50 kg per cubic metre or 5% mass is typical). 
It is also relevant to include reference to the way furniture has evolved with regard to the recreational use of e.g. television watching and lower cost allows more regular change to take account of such issues as design, moving accommodation and deterioration due to the way it is used.
Bed Mattresses may be considered in the same way with appropriate allowance for the different usage although the amount of time in use is probably higher. This brings significant implications for the end of life in time and the end value of the materials used in manufacture.
It is also worth noting that all of the above also includes a high availability of air within the article leading to the ignition risk concerns and the introduction of the UK Furniture Fire Regulations (FFR).

Automobile

An automotive upholsterer, also known as a trimmer, coach trimmer or motor trimmer, shares many of the skills required in upholstery, in addition to being able to work with carpet.

The term coach trimmer derives from the days when car frames were produced by manufacturers and delivered to coach builders to add a car body and interior trimmings. Trimmers would produce soft furnishings, carpets, soft tops, and roof linings often to order to customer specifications. Later, trim shops were often an in-house part of the production line as the production process was broken down into smaller parts manageable by semi-skilled labor.

Many automotive trimmers now work either in automotive design or with aftermarket trim shops carrying out repairs, restorations or conversions for customers directly. A few high-quality motor car manufacturers still employ trimmers, for example, Aston Martin.

Commercial
This is the type of upholstery work offered to businesses. Examples would be restaurant seating consisting of booth seats, dining room chairs, bar stools, etc. Also churches, including but not limited to pews and chairs for the congregation, hospitals and clinics consisting of medical tables, chiropractic tables, dental chairs, etc. Also common to this type of upholstery would be lobby and waiting-area seating. Upholstered walls are found in some retail premises.

Marine

Upholsterers may be called upon to repair or replace seating, cushions, cabin furnishings, headliners and even carpeting on boats.

Marine upholstery differs in that one has to consider dampness, sunlight and hard usage. There are many sources for marine grade vinyls such as Spradling and Morbern and they come in hundreds of colors and styles now.

Each style of marine grade vinyl is rated according to cold crack, rub counts, and mold resistance.
Stainless-steel hardware such as staples, screws must be used to prevent rust and early break down of hardware and fasteners. The newest products for fastening vinyl in marine applications are Tenara thread and Monel staples. Any wood used must be of marine quality.

Usually a high-resiliency, high-density plastic foam with a thin film of plastic over it is used to keep out water that might get by the seams. Closed-cell foam is used on smaller cushions which can, sometimes, double as flotation devices.

See also

Related tools
 Chalk (upholsterer's chalk or tailor's chalk)
 Goggles
 Needle guards
 Rubber mallet
 Scissors
 Sewing machine
 Staple gun
 Staple knocker (staple puller)
 Upholstery hammer
 Upholstery needles (round point curved needles and button needles)
 Upholstery regulator
 Webbing stretcher

Materials
 Buttons
 Staples
 Tacks (upholstery tacks, various sizes)
 Zippers

Skills
 Cutting
 Sewing

See also
 Canvas work
 Slipcover
 Throw pillow
 Martindale (unit), measure of wear resistance of textiles used for upholstery
 Museo della tappezzeria — Upholstery Museum (in Italian Wikipedia)
 Upholstery frame
 Turkeywork

References

Bibliography 
 

 
Crafts
Furniture
Furniture-making
Textiles